"So Lonely" is a 1979 song by The Police.

So Lonely may also refer to:
"So Lonely" (The Superjesus song), 2004
"So Lonely" (Twista song), 2006
"So Lonely", a song by The Hollies from the 1965 album Hollies
"So Lonely", a song  by Loudness from the 1987 album Hurricane Eyes
"So Lonely", a 2001 song by Jakatta & Monsoon, a remix of Monsoon's 1982 song "Ever So Lonely"
"So Lonely", a 2004 song by The Bleeders
So Lonely, a 2010 album by Heaven